Tim the Tiny Horse is a short film about a very small horse, written and directed by comedian Harry Hill. It was first released in 2005.

Sequels
Tim the Tiny Horse At Large was released on September 4, 2009. Another film, A Complete History of Tim (the Tiny Horse), was released on March 9, 2014.

References

External links

 Author's website
  The Tim the Tiny Horse section on the author's website
 Tim the Tiny Horse on Faber Children's Books website
 Tim the Tiny Horse on Booktrust.org

2006 short story collections
2006 children's books
Children's short story collections
Fantasy short story collections
British children's books
Harry Hill
Faber and Faber books